APCO may refer to:

 Apco Aviation, an Israeli aircraft manufacturer
 APCO Worldwide, a public relations firm
 Air Pollution Control Officer
 Association of Public-Safety Communications Officials-International, an organization providing standards for telecommunications 
 APCO radiotelephony spelling alphabet, a phonetic spelling alphabet
 Project 25, a modern public safety radio standard
 APCO-16, an older telecommunications standard 
 APCO Oil Corporation, a defunct Oklahoma-based petroleum business
 Apco Keara, an Israeli-made paraglider
 Apco Fiesta, a family of paragliders
 Association of Pleasure Craft Operators (UK)
 APCO - Andhra Pradesh State Handloom Weavers Cooperative Society